Nǁng  or Nǁŋǃke, commonly known by the name of its dialect Nǀuu (Nǀhuki), is a moribund Tuu (Khoisan) language once spoken in South Africa. It is no longer spoken on a daily basis, as the speakers live in different villages. The dialect name ǂKhomani is used for the entire people by the South African government, but the descendants of ǂKhomani-dialect speakers now speak Khoikhoi. As of June 2021, only one speaker of the Nǀuu dialect and two of the ǁʼAu dialect remain.

Classification and name
Nǁng belongs to the Tuu (Taa–ǃKwi) language family, with extinct ǀXam being its closest relative and Taa its closest living relative.

The two recent dialects are Nǀuu (Nǀhuki) and ǁʼAu (ǁKhʼau). Extinct dialects include ǂKhomani and Langeberg. ǂKhomani had been recorded by Doke and by Maingard, Nǀhuki by Weshphal, and Langeberg by Dorothea Bleek. As of 2010, most remaining speakers spoke Nǀuu dialect, and this was the name Nǁng appeared under when it was rediscovered. However, two spoke ǁʼAu and rejected the label Nǀuu.

Of the names Nǀuu, ǁʼAu, and Nǁng, the easiest for English speakers to pronounce is Nǀuu. The letter that looks like a vertical bar (sometimes carelessly substituted with a slash) represents a dental click like the English interjection tsk! tsk! The double-vertical-bar in "Nǁng" is a (single) lateral click, pronounced like the tchick! used to spur on a horse; the name is pronounced like the ng of sung with this click in it.

The word nǀuu  is actually a verb, 'to speak Nǀuu'.  The people call themselves Nǁŋ-ǂe  'people', and Westphal believes this may be the term recorded by Bleek and variously rendered in the literature as ǁNg ǃʼe, ǁn-ǃke, ǁŋ.ǃke.

The name Nǀusan is an ambiguous Khoekhoe exonym, and is used for several Tuu languages.  Traill says that the ǀʼAuni call their language Nǀhuki, but others have recorded their name for their language as ǀʼAuo, and both Westphal and Köhler state that Nǀhuki (Nǀhuci, nǀɦuki) is a variety of Nǁng.  It is not clear if both are correct or if languages have gotten mixed up in the literature.

History 
Nǁng prospered through the 19th century, but encroaching non-ǃKwi languages and acculturation threatened it, like most other Khoisan languages. The language was mainly displaced by Afrikaans and Nama, especially after speakers started migrating to towns in the 1930s and found themselves surrounded by non-Nǁng-speaking people. In 1973 their language was declared extinct, and the remaining Nǁnǂe ("ǂKhomani") were evicted from the Kalahari Gemsbok National Park.

In the 1990s, linguists located 101-year-old Elsie Vaalbooi, who could still speak Nǁng. Anthony Traill interviewed her in 1997. The South African San Institute soon became involved in the pursuit of information on the Nǁng language, and with the help of Vaalbooi they tracked down 25 other people scattered by the eviction who were able to speak or at least understand the language. Thabo Mbeki handed over 400 km2 of land to the Nǁnǂe in 1999, and 250 km2 of land within the park in 2002. Vaalbooi came up with the Nǁng motto of Sa ǁʼa ǃainsi uinsi "We move towards a better life" for her rehabilitated people. This was also adopted as the official motto for the Northern Cape Province. At the time there were twenty elderly speakers, eight of whom lived in the Western Cape province signed over to them. As of 2007, fewer than ten are still alive in South Africa, and a few more in Botswana; none live with another speaker, and their daily languages are Khoekhoe and Tswana, respectively. The younger generations of ǂKhomani are proud Nama speakers, and have little affinity to Nǁng, so there is little chance of saving the language.

Recent research on Nǁng led by Amanda Miller of Cornell University has helped describe the physics of its clicks, leading to a better understanding of click sounds in general.

Efforts to perpetuate the Nǁng language continue in 2017 and in 2021. The first children's book, !Qhoi n|a Tjhoi (Tortoise and Ostrich), was written by Katriena Esau, one of the two surviving speakers at the time, in May 2021. In October 2022, the Dutch NOS referred to Katrina Esau, or "Oma Katrina", as the last speaker of Nǀuu. She was teaching the language to a group of children, including her grandson and great-grandson, all speakers of Afrikaans.

Phonology
Nǁng has one of the more complex sound inventories of the world's languages. Most lexical words consist of a phonological foot with two moras (tone-bearing units). The first mora must start with a consonant (CV). The second mora may be a single vowel (V), a nasal consonant m or n (N), or one of a drastically reduced number of consonants plus a vowel (cV). That is, lexical roots, not counting sometimes lexicalized CV prefixes and suffixes, are typically CVcV, CVV, CVN, though there are also a few which are CV, as well as longer words of two phonological feet: CVCV, where the second C is not one of the reduced set of consonants but cannot be a click, CVCVN, CVVCV, CVNCV, CVVCVN, CVNCVN, CVcVCV, CVVCVcV. Grammatical words tend to be CV or V.

There are occasional exceptions to these patterns in ideophonic words such as  'Namaqua sandgrouse' (CVcVCVCVV + suffix) and historically reduplicated words with clicks such as  'to talk'.

Vowels
Like most languages in southern Africa, Nǁng has five vowel qualities. These may occur strident and nasalized. A word may have two adjacent vowels, which resemble a long vowel or diphthong.

The strident vowels are thought to have the phonation called harsh voice. They are strongly pharyngealized, and for some speakers involve low-frequency trilling that presumably involves the aryepiglottic fold. The four strident vowel qualities (there is no strident i) are rather different from the non-strident vowels, as is common when a vowel is pharyngealized.

Nǁng is the only Khoisan language known to have a strident front vowel, though this is rare, occurring in only two known words,  'to fly' and  'loincloth'. The lack of a nasalized equivalent is thought to be an accidental gap or simply unattested due to the small number of known words.

The tone-bearing segment may be a syllabic nasal, rather than a vowel, as in the name Nǁng.

Only certain sequences of vowels may occur in a bimoraic foot, regardless of whether there is an intervening consonant. (That is, the permitted vowels are the same whether a word is CVcV or CVV.) The vowels must be both oral or both nasal; nasal vowels cannot follow a nasal stop (though they may follow nasal clicks). Only the first vowel may be strident.

Tones
Nǁng moras may carry a high or low tone, /H/ or /L/. A typical lexical word consists of two moras, and so may have a high (HH), low (LL), rising (LH), or falling (HL) tone.

Monomoraic lexical roots, such as  'mouth', are high- rather than low-tone by a 5–1 margin. CVV and CVN roots are HH, HL, and LH with about equal frequency, with LL slightly less common. However, half of all CVcV roots are LH, making it markedly frequent, while only 5% are HL. In an additional CV foot the distribution of H and L is approximately equal; an additional CVN or CVcV foot may pattern like an initial foot, but they are too infrequent to be sure.

Consonants
The majority of Nǁng consonants are clicks. It was once thought that Khoisan languages distinguish velar and uvular clicks, but recent research into Nǁng, and reevaluation of the data on ǃXóõ, indicates that, for these languages at least, the distinction is one of pure clicks versus click–plosive contours.

"(?)" marks possible accidental gaps; these consonants might be expected based on their occurrence in neighboring languages with similar phonologies, but are expected to be rare, and may occur in Nǁng words that have not been recorded.

What were historically initial alveolar occlusives have become pre-palatal in lexical words. Among grammatical words in Nǀuu dialect there is a single exception, ná 'I'; in ǁʼAu dialect even that has merged, for ɲá 'I'.

Only sonorants may occur as the medial consonant of a phonological foot.  is only known from three words. The oral sonorants do not occur in initial position.

These are simple clicks. The traditional term "velaric" is something of a misnomer, for the rear articulation is further back than the velum, and indeed further back than Nǁng . Miller et al. prefer the term "lingual" for this airstream mechanism; they also reject the existence of click "accompaniments", using the IPA symbols to represent both points of articulation rather than solely the anterior articulation. Besides being motivated phonetically, this has the benefit of better illustrating the parallels between clicks and pulmonic consonants.

In the above rubric, the first element of the name is the forward articulation, and the second is the rear articulation.

These are airstream contour consonants, which start off with a lingual (velaric) airstream mechanism and finish with a pulmonic airstream (whereas affricates are manner contour consonants, starting as plosives and finishing as fricatives). Traditionally, these were considered to be uvular clicks, because the uvular or pharyngeal closure is audible, but in fact the rear closure of all Nǁng clicks is uvular or pharyngeal. (The distinction between uvular and pharyngeal is not represented here.) Effectively, in these clicks the release of the rear articulation is delayed, so that there is a double release burst, the forward (lingual) release followed by the rear (pulmonic) release.

These differ from the previous consonants in that the second, rear release is an ejective.

Notes

References

External links
South African San Institute
Nǀuu Pronunciation Dictionary at Forvo
Excerpt of The Linguists
Oma Katrina wil als laatste spreker de oude taal Nǀuu redden at NOS
Nǁng Valency Patterns (with examples)
ELAR Archive deposit of Nǀuu language description by Bonny Sands
Nǁng DoReCo corpus compiled by Tom Güldemann, Martina Ernszt, Sven Siegmund and Alena Witzlack-Makarevich. Audio recordings of narrative texts with transcriptions time-aligned at the phone level, translations, and time-aligned morphological annotations.

Tuu languages
Languages of South Africa
Endangered languages of Africa